Dead Children Playing (first edition titled 'Dead Children Playing: A Picture Book') is a picture book by Stanley Donwood and Thom Yorke (under the alias of "Dr. Tchock") featuring artwork that has been used on English alternative rock band Radiohead's albums between 1996 and 2003, and on Thom Yorke's album The Eraser. The book also contains works of art that have not previously been released, made between 1999 and 2005.

Editions
The first edition of Dead Children Playing was released in 2006, designed to accompany Donwood and Yorke's art exhibition at the Iguapop Gallery in Barcelona, Spain, from November 26 to December 16. The book quickly sold out and was re-released in 2007.

The second edition was released on 1 October 2007 by Verso Publishing. This edition included 12 more pages than the original printing, containing writings that are also available on Donwood's website. The second edition also had a different cover: "Manhattan" from the series of artwork that accompanied Radiohead's 2003 album Hail to the Thief.

References

External links
 Dead Children Playing Website
 Dead Children Playing on Amazon

2006 books
Radiohead
Works by Thom Yorke